Electoral district of Eastern Suburbs may refer to:

 Electoral district of Eastern Suburbs (New South Wales)
 Electoral district of Eastern Suburbs (Victoria)